Public holidays in Rhodesia, a historical region in southern Africa equivalent to today's Zimbabwe and Zambia—formerly Southern and Northern Rhodesia, respectively—were largely based around milestones in the region's short history. Annual holidays marked various aspects of the arrival of white people during the 1880s and 1890s, as well as the respective unilateral declarations of independence (1965) and of republican government (1970). On these days, most businesses and non-essential services closed. A number of Christian holidays were also observed according to custom, in the traditional British manner, and referred to in official documents by name—Christmas Day, for example, or Easter Monday.

Rhodesian non-work days were first defined in 1895, by The Bills of Exchange Regulations passed by Leander Starr Jameson, the second administrator of the territory appointed by the British South Africa Company. Holidays were instituted along traditional British lines, with some others created exclusively for Rhodesia: Shangani Day, on 4 December, marked the anniversary of the Shangani Patrol being killed in battle, while Rhodes's Day and Founders' Day—respectively commemorating Company chief Cecil Rhodes and his contemporaries—were held consecutively, starting on the first or second Monday of each July, to create the annual four-day "Rhodes and Founders' weekend". Shangani Day was replaced as a public holiday by Occupation Day in 1920, but continued to be unofficially marked thereafter. Occupation Day, held on 12 September each year, marked the anniversary of the arrival of the Pioneer Column at Fort Salisbury in 1890, and their raising of the Union Jack on the kopje overlooking the site. It was renamed Pioneers' Day in 1961.

Southern Rhodesia effectively became the entirety of Rhodesia in 1964 when Northern Rhodesia became independent as Zambia. After Southern Rhodesia's colonial government unilaterally declared independence from Britain on 11 November 1965, the anniversary became celebrated as Independence Day. The penultimate Monday in October was designated Republic Day in 1970 following the adoption of a republican system of government. All of these holidays were celebrated until 1979, when Rhodesia reconstituted itself under majority rule as the unrecognised state of Zimbabwe-Rhodesia. The country's national holidays were replaced soon after with alternatives intended to be more inclusive: President's Day, Unity Day and Ancestors' Day. These were in turn superseded in April 1980, when the country became the recognised state of Zimbabwe. The modern Zimbabwean holiday calendar differs radically from that of Rhodesia, but retains every one of the traditional holidays defined by name in the 1895 Bills of Exchange Regulations, with the exception of Whit Monday.

Rhodesian holidays
Key
 The Rhodesian flag (1968–79) appears beside the names of those national holidays exclusive to Rhodesia.
"Years observed" refers to years when the holiday was official as a non-work day; traditional holidays such as Christmas were observed by Rhodesians before 1895, but no legal framework for public holidays had yet been enacted.

Notes and references
Footnote

References

Online sources

Newspaper articles

Bibliography

See also 

 Public holidays in Zimbabwe

 
Rhodesia
Rhodesia-related lists